Richard Doron Johnson is an American composer, jazz pianist, and music professor. He is a Jazz professor at the Peabody Conservatory of Music in Baltimore. Johnson often plays at music venues and jazz festivals such as the Detroit International Jazz Festival, Marciac France jazz festival, Chicago Jazz Festival and Hyde Park Jazz Festival.

Background
Johnson was introduced to music at an early age, specifically the piano, by his father, a gospel pianist from Baltimore, Maryland. Immediately after being born in Pittsburgh, Richard’s family moved to Canfield, OH where they lived until 1984. After living here they moved to Harrisburgh, PA where he played trumpet in middle school and valve trombone in high school until 10th grade. In 1991, Due to Richard’s fathers job they were transferred again to Boxford, MA where he graduated from Masconomet High School in Topsfield.

Richard Johnson’s alma maters are the Berklee College of Music, where he graduated in a mere two years, and the Boston Conservatory of Music, where he received a music scholarship and his Master’s Degree in Jazz Pedagogy.

Career
Johnson received an Artist Performance Diploma at Thelonious Monk Institute of Jazz Performance at New England Conservatory (now Herbie Hancock Institute). From 2000 to 2003, he was a member of Wynton Marsalis’ Septet and the Jazz Lincoln Center Orchestra. He was also part of the Russell Malone Quartet, Delfeayo Marsalis Quintet, and the Bobby Watson Quartet. After time spent with those groups, Johnson started the Reach Afar Program, catered to those aged 7 to 17, educating them on the connection between jazz and hip-hop. In 1999, he was named United States Musical Ambassador and did six state department tours across the world from Latin America to the Middle East, totaling more than 76 countries. Johnson has also performed along the sides of jazz icons like Herbie Hancock, Wayne Shorter, and Arturo Sandoval. In 2005, he became a musical director for the Atlanta Hawks. This position allowed him the chance to put together a Hip-Hop instrumental quartet which performed during the in game play for all 92 season games.

In 2015 Johnson became the Jazz Ambassador of the Jazz at Lincoln Center Doha Club at the St Regis Hotel. Currently, Johnson serves as a Jazz professor at the Peabody Conservatory of Music in Baltimore and piano instructor for the Ravina Jazz Program in Chicago. He has had four musical releases, with his current project titled 2 of A Kind, co-lead with Gregory Generet, featuring a talented jazz ensemble with Freddie Hendrix on trumpet, Jon Beshay on tenor saxophone, Barry Stephenson on Bass, and Henry Conerway on drums.

Discography

As leader
"Stride Ways" 1998
"Battle Grounds" 2010
"Here I am" 2013
"Music Business" 2017

As sideman/contributor
"United We Swing-"  2019  Wynton Marsalis 
"Check Cashing Day " 2013 Bobby Watson
"Soul House"  2008  Christian Winther
"The Only Plan" 2011 Christian Winther
"Jam Session" 2006 Trombone Steeple Chase
"Jam Session"  2005 Tenor sax  Steeple Chase
" Half Past Autumn" Irvin Mayfield 2003  Basin Street records
" How Passion Falls" Irvin Mayfield 2001  Basin Street Records

References

Living people
1975 births
Masconomet Regional High School alumni
Berklee College of Music alumni
Boston Conservatory at Berklee alumni
Musicians from Pittsburgh
African-American jazz pianists
American jazz composers
21st-century African-American people
20th-century African-American people